KVIT is an FM radio station broadcasting on 88.7 FM, licensed in Chandler, Arizona, United States. KVIT is licensed to the East Valley Institute of Technology. Its studios are located at EVIT's main facilities in Mesa, while the transmitter is to the south near Maricopa. The station is branded as The Pulse.

History
The station was licensed to the Arizona Community Media Foundation, then-operator of Radio Phoenix, but in early 2015, AZCMF sold the station to the East Valley Institute of Technology, which already owned KVIT (90.7 FM) in Apache Junction, for $700,000.

On August 11, 2015, KPNG came to air and replaced KVIT and its then-translator K224CJ. While EVIT maintained ownership of KVIT for another six years, K224CJ, which was independently owned the whole time, now carries KAZG AM 1440. In 2021, EVIT sold the Apache Junction facility to Desert Soul Media, Inc., which had acquired Radio Phoenix earlier in the year; when the sale closed on December 9, the KVIT call letters remained with EVIT and were placed on 88.7, while 90.7 became KRDP.

Programs
Programming on KVIT is largely produced by EVIT students and local DJs, though there are exceptions, such as AIA-produced high school football telecasts. From its sign on until 2022, it mainly focused on Top 40 music with a rhythmic lean, but after founding radio instructor Steve Grosz left EVIT, the format started to pivot towards alternative rock. The station stopped streaming around the same time, and their internet presence currently consists of a mention on EVIT's website.

Radio Phoenix
88.7 FM airs three shows originating from community station Radio Phoenix (operated by former KPNG permittee Arizona Community Media Foundation from 2008-2021; now operated by Desert Soul Media, Inc.). These shows include The Althea Long Show (reggae and Caribbean music), My World of Music (reggae and world music), and Full Moon Hacksaw (traditional jazz and blues).

References

External links
 88.7 The Pulse 
 East Valley Institute of Technology's Radio/Audio Production program

VIT
Radio stations established in 2015
Dance radio stations
2015 establishments in Arizona